Aminabad (also Romanized as Amīnābād; also known as Sāmān) is a village in Atrak Rural District, Maneh District, Maneh and Samalqan County, North Khorasan Province, Iran. At the 2006 census, its population was 31, in 6 families.

References 

Populated places in Maneh and Samalqan County